Long Pond or Longs Pond may refer to:

Natural Feature

 Long Pond, Tunkhannock Creek, Pennsylvania, Monroe County, Tunkhannock Township

Anguilla
 Long Pond, Anguilla

Canada
 Long Pond, St. John's, Newfoundland and Labrador
 A community in Conception Bay South
 Long Pond (Herring Cove, Nova Scotia)
 The purported birthplace of hockey in Windsor, Nova Scotia

United States

Maine 
Long Pond (Belgrade Lakes)
 Long Pond (Hancock County, Maine), Hancock County, Maine
Long Pond (Moose River)

Massachusetts 

 Long Pond (West Yarmouth, Massachusetts)
 Long Pond (Lakeville, Massachusetts)
 Long Pond (Plymouth, Massachusetts)
 Long Pond (Rochester, Massachusetts)

New Jersey and New York 
 Long Pond (New York), near Oswegatchie Camp, Lewis County, New York
 Long Pond (Chenango County, New York)
 Long Pond (Hamilton County, New York)
 Long Pond (Warren County, New York)
 Greenwood Lake, once known as Long Pond, New Jersey / New York
 Lake Owassa, once known as Long Pond, New Jersey
 Long Pond Ironworks State Park, Hewitt, New Jersey

Pennsylvania 
 Long Pond, Pennsylvania, Pocono Mountains

Washington
 Longs Pond